Warrendale may refer to:

Warrendale (film), a Canadian documentary film
Warrendale, Detroit, a neighbourhood of Detroit, Michigan
Warrendale, Oregon, a community in Oregon
Warrendale, Pennsylvania, a suburb of Pittsburgh
Warrendale, Waltham, a neighborhood of Waltham, Massachusetts